Gelechia junctipunctella is a moth of the family Gelechiidae. It is found in Algeria.

References

Moths described in 1920
Gelechia